Gelechia ekhingolica is a moth of the family Gelechiidae. It is found in Palearctic realm.

References

Moths described in 1989
Gelechia